Agonopterix petasitis is a moth of the family Depressariidae. It is found in France, Germany, Poland, the Czech Republic, Slovakia, Austria, Switzerland, Italy, Hungary and Romania.

The larvae feed on Petasites hybridus.

References

External links
lepiforum.de

Moths described in 1851
Agonopterix
Moths of Europe